Gail may refer to:

People

Gail (given name), list of notable people with the given name

Surname
 Jean-Baptiste Gail (1755–1829), French Hellenist scholar
 Max Gail (born 1943), American actor
 Sophie Gail (1775–1819), French singer and composer

Places
Austria
 Gail (river), Austria
United States
 Gail, Texas
 Gail Lake Township, Minnesota

Other uses
 Gail's, British cafe and bakery chain
 GAIL, Gas Authority of India Limited
 GAIL: GNOME Accessibility Implementation Library – implements the computing accessibility interfaces defined by the GNOME Accessibility Toolkit (ATK)
 Gail Valley dialect, a Slovene dialect in Central Europe

See also
 Gael (given name)
 Gale (disambiguation)
 Gayle (disambiguation)